Samsara Sangeetham is a 1989 Indian Tamil-language film written, directed, produced, photographed and scored by T. Rajendar. He himself stars with Renuka, while the film also features his life son Silambarasan. The film released on 21 July 1989.

Plot

Cast 
 T. Rajendar
 Renuka
 Silambarasan

Soundtrack 
The soundtrack was written and composed by T. Rajendar.
 "I Am A Little Star" – Singer(s): S. Janaki, Chorus
 "Santheyga Puyaladicha"    - 	Singer(s): K. J. Yesudas
 "Paal Kothicha Pongi" – Singer(s): K. J. Yesudas
 "Thanga Katti Pola" – Singer(s): S. P. Balasubrahmanyam
 "Samiyoda" – Singer(s): Malaysia Vasudevan, Chorus
 "Aararo Thai Pada" – Singer(s): K. J. Yesudas
 "Noolu Illa Oosiyila" – Singer(s): K. S. Chithra
 "Othayadi Pathaiyila"      - 	Singer(s): S. P. Balasubrahmanyam
 "Valli Mayil" – Singer(s): S. P. Balasubrahmanyam, Chorus
 "Unakku Kannai Naanirukka" – Singer(s): S. Janaki, S. P. Balasubrahmanyam
 "Kankalum Enguthu" – Singer(s): S. P. Balasubrahmanyam
 "Chokka Vaikkum Sultana" – Singer(s): S. Janaki, S. P. Balasubrahmanyam
 "I Am A Little Star" – Singer(s): S. Janaki, Chorus

References

External links 
 

1980s Tamil-language films
1989 films
Films directed by T. Rajendar
Films scored by T. Rajendar
Films with screenplays by T. Rajendar